Carlton Trail—Eagle Creek is a federal electoral district in Saskatchewan. It encompasses a portion of Saskatchewan formerly included in the electoral districts of Saskatoon—Humboldt, Saskatoon—Rosetown—Biggar, and Saskatoon—Wanuskewin.

Carlton Trail—Eagle Creek was created by the 2012 federal electoral boundaries redistribution and was legally defined in the 2013 representation order. It came into effect upon the call of the 42nd Canadian federal election, scheduled for 19 October 2015.

The riding was originally intended to be named Humboldt—Warman—Martensville—Rosetown.

Members of Parliament

This riding has elected the following Members of Parliament:

Election results

References

Saskatchewan federal electoral districts
Biggar, Saskatchewan
Humboldt, Saskatchewan
Martensville
Rosetown
Politics of Saskatoon